L'amante di Gramigna (internationally released as The Bandit) is a 1969 Italian drama film directed by  Carlo Lizzani. For this film Stefania Sandrelli was awarded as best actress at the San Sebastián International Film Festival.

Cast
 Gian Maria Volonté: Gramigna
 Stefania Sandrelli: Gemma
 Luigi Pistilli: Ramarro
 Ivo Garrani: Baron Nardò
 Emilia Radeva: mother of Gemma
 Assen Milanov: the notary
 Marian Dimitrov
 Stizio Mazgalov
 Stoienka Mutafova
 Vassil Popoliev
 Gianni Pulone
 Peter Petrov Slabakov
 Stoian Stoiciev
 Ivan Dimitrov Penkov

References

External links
 

1969 films
Italian drama films
Films directed by Carlo Lizzani
Films set in Sicily
Films set in the 1860s
Films shot in Bulgaria
Films based on works by Giovanni Verga
Films produced by Dino De Laurentiis
1960s Italian films